Paul Reynolds (born 23 May 1973) is an English cricket umpire representing Ireland. In November 2016, he was named the Official of the Year at the Cricket Ireland Awards. In June 2018, he was appointed to the International Panel of Umpires and Referees.

He stood in his first Twenty20 International (T20I), between Ireland and Afghanistan, on 22 August 2018. He stood in his first One Day International (ODI), also between Ireland and Afghanistan, on 29 August 2018.

In April 2019, he was one of four umpires to be awarded a full-time season contract by Cricket Ireland, the first time that Cricket Ireland have offered such contracts to umpires.

See also
 List of One Day International cricket umpires
 List of Twenty20 International cricket umpires

References

1973 births
Living people
Irish One Day International cricket umpires
Irish Twenty20 International cricket umpires
Place of birth missing (living people)
Sportspeople from Crawley